Khiladi is a 1968 Hindi action film directed by Homi Wadia for Basant Pictures. It was produced under the Homi Wadia Production banner with music composed by Lala Sattar and lyrics written by Faruk Kaiser. Fearless Nadia starred in nearly fifty Wadia films, making stunt history starting with Hunterwali (1935). Khiladi was Nadia's last role in films. The film starred Nadia, Dilip Raj, Sujata, Amarnath, Suzie, Uma and Vishwas Kunte.

Nadia had last done an action role nine years earlier. Around the age of fifty-eight she made a flamboyant come-back in a cleverly executed "James Bond" type character in Khiladi where she was code-named "Living Fireball".

Cast
 Fearless Nadia
 Dileep Raj
 Uma
 Sujata
 Sheikh
 Suzie
 Amarnath
 W. M. Khan
 Vishwas Kunte
 Habib

Music
The music direction was by Lala Sattar and lyrics written by Faruk Kaiser. The singers were Mohammed Rafi and Asha Bhosle.

Songlist

References

External links

1968 films
1960s Hindi-language films
Indian black-and-white films
Films directed by Homi Wadia
1960s action adventure films
Indian action adventure films